The following lists events that happened during 1921 in South Africa.

Incumbents
 Monarch: King George V.
 Governor-General and High Commissioner for Southern Africa: Prince Arthur of Connaught.
 Prime Minister: Jan Smuts.
 Chief Justice: James Rose Innes.

Events
May
 3 – The second census of the Union of South Africa takes place.
 24 – The Bulhoek Massacre takes place with an estimated 163 killed.

July
 30 – The Communist Party of South Africa is established.

December
 28 – White gold miners on the Witwatersrand go on strike in the Rand Rebellion.

Unknown date
 Dagbreek men's residence opens at Stellenbosch University.

Births
 30 May – Jamie Uys, actor and film director. (d. 1996)
 21 July – Vusamazulu Credo Mutwa, Zulu sangoma and author (d. 2020)

Deaths
 10 September – John Tengo Jabavu, editor of South Africa's first newspaper in Xhosa. (b. 1859)

Railways

Railway lines opened

 1 November – Transvaal – Pretoria West to Roberts Heights, .
 28 November – Natal – Booth Junction to Cato Ridge, .

Locomotives
Two new Cape gauge locomotive types enter service on the South African Railways (SAR):
 February – A single experimental  2-6-0+0-6-2 Garratt articulated steam locomotive, the first Cape gauge Garratt in South Africa.
 June – The first of seven Class GB 2-6-2+2-6-2 Garratt locomotives.

References

South Africa
Years in South Africa
History of South Africa